Gladstones may refer to:

 Thomas Gladstones (1732–1809), Scottish merchant and philanthropist
 Sir John Gladstone, 1st Baronet (born Gladstones, 1764–1851), Scottish politician and son of Thomas
 Gladstones Malibu, an American seafood restaurant commonly referred to as Gladstones  
 The Gladstones, a working title for the TV series The Flintstones

See also
 Gladstone (disambiguation)